Eberhart Jensen (22 July 1922 – 16 January 2003) was a Norwegian astrophysicist.

He was born in Røyken as a son of farmer Edvard Jensen (1850–1930) and Berthe Marie Kristiansen (1883–1961). He finished his secondary education in 1942 and graduated from the University of Oslo with the cand.real. degree in 1949. During the occupation of Norway, after the 1943 University of Oslo fire, he was arrested together with a thousand students and sent to Stavern. In December he was shipped on to Sennheim, later Buchenwald. He survived until the camp was liberated. In 1948 he married Liv Linnestad.

He took his Ph.D. at the University of Chicago in 1953, and was hired as lecturer at the University of Oslo in 1959 and docent in 1961. His fields were mainly solar physics and plasma physics. From 1965 to 1992 he served as professor, and he also edited  the official Norwegian almanac from 1966 to 1993. He was admitted into the Norwegian Academy of Science and Letters in 1965.

He resided in Østerås. He died in January 2003, aged 80.

References

1922 births
2003 deaths
People from Røyken
Sennheim concentration camp survivors
Buchenwald concentration camp survivors
University of Oslo alumni
University of Chicago alumni
Academic staff of the University of Oslo
Norwegian astrophysicists
Norwegian almanac editors
Members of the Norwegian Academy of Science and Letters
Norwegian expatriates in the United States